2,5-diamino-6-hydroxy-4-(5-phosphoribosylamino)pyrimidine is a metabolite in the purine metabolism, formed by the hydrolysis of GTP by GTP cyclohydrolase II. Alternatively two separate enzymes can carry out this reaction, initially GTP cyclohydrolase IIa hydrolyses the 8,9 bond to form 2-Amino-5-formylamino-6-(5-phospho-D-ribosylamino)pyrimidin-4(3H)-one, followed by de-formylation by 2-amino-5-formylamino-6-ribosylaminopyrimidin-4(3H)-one 5'-monophosphate deformylase. 2,5-diamino-6-hydroxy-4-(5-phosphoribosylamino)pyrimidine is deaminated by Diaminohydroxyphosphoribosylaminopyrimidine deaminase to form 5-amino-6-(5-phosphoribosylamino)uracil.

References

Pyrimidines